Luodian may refer to:

Luodian County (罗甸), a county in Qiannan Buyei and Miao Autonomous Prefecture, Guizhou
Luodian, Shanghai (罗店), a town in Baoshan District, Shanghai
Luodian, Jingshan County (罗店), a town in Jingshan County, Jingmen, Hubei
Luodian Township, Guangshui (骆店), a township in Guangshui, Suizhou, Hubei
Luodian Township, Henan (罗店), a township in Runan County, Zhumadian, Henan
Luodian, Zhejiang (罗店), a town in Wucheng District, Jinhua, Zhejiang

See also
Ludian (disambiguation)